Brain Drain may refer to:

Human capital flight, also known as "brain drain"
Brain Drain (album), a Ramones album
Brain Drain (comics), a Marvel Comics character
"Brain Drain" (Charmed), an episode of the television series Charmed
Brain Drain (film), 2009 Spanish comedy film directed by Fernando González Molina
"Brain Drain", an episode of the Disney cartoon series Phineas and Ferb
"Brain Drain", an episode of the Disney television series The Book of Pooh
"Brain Drain", an episode of the Marathon Media cartoon series Totally Spies
"Brain Drain", an episode of the Nickelodeon cartoon series Fanboy & Chum Chum
"Brain Drain", an episode of the Nickelodeon television series The Penguins of Madagascar
Brain Drain, the slide filled with soap in Nickelodeon's game show, BrainSurge
The Brain Drain, a BBC comedy panel show
Brain Drain, a previously unreleased song by British rock band The Lightning Seeds on 1997 compilation album Like You Do...  Best of The Lightning Seeds